Éva Schubert (19 January 1931 – 11 July 2017) was a Hungarian actress, who won a Kossuth Prize in 2013 for her lifetime achievement. She was born and died in Budapest.

References

1931 births
2017 deaths
Actresses from Budapest
Hungarian film actresses
Hungarian television actresses